The highest-selling singles in Japan are ranked in the Oricon Singles Chart, which is published by Oricon Style magazine. The data are compiled by Oricon based on each singles' physical sales. This list includes the singles that reached the number one place on that chart in 1970.

Oricon Weekly Singles Chart

References

1970 in Japanese music
Japan Oricon
Oricon 1970